Alexander MacKay (born 10 January 1963 from Caithness) is a former Scottish professional darts player, who played in Professional Darts Corporation events.

Career
MacKay played in the 2004 PDC World Darts Championship, he defeating Barry Jouannet of Australia in Last 48, but lost in the last 40 to Lionel Sams of England.

World Championship performances

PDC
 2004: Last 40: (lost to Lionel Sams 2–3) (sets)

References

External links

1963 births
Living people
Scottish darts players
Professional Darts Corporation associate players